Leonard Andrew Callander (born August 17, 1956) is a Canadian former professional ice hockey centre who spents parts of four seasons in the National Hockey League in the late 1970s.

Born in Regina, Saskatchewan, Callander was the second-round pick (35th overall) of the Philadelphia Flyers in the 1976 NHL Entry Draft after a 105-point season for the Regina Pats of the WHL. Turning pro the following season, he spent most of the season in the AHL for the Springfield Indians, although he did receive a two-game callup to the Flyers and scored his first NHL goal on his first shift.

Callander would play only 16 more games for a deep Flyers team before being dealt to the Vancouver Canucks midway through the 1978–79 season. He finished the year with 4 goals and 5 points in 32 games between Philadelphia and Vancouver, all career highs. He would remain with the Canuck organization until 1982, but spent almost all of this time with the Dallas Black Hawks, Vancouver's Central Hockey League affiliate, seeing only 4 more games of NHL action in the 1979–80 season.

After being released by the Canucks, Callander spent four seasons playing in Germany before returning to North America to play one last season with the Muskegon Lumberjacks of the IHL before retiring.

In his career, Callander played 39 NHL games, recording 6 goals and 8 points along with 7 penalty minutes.

Callander is the older brother of Jock Callander. The two played together for Muskegon in 1986–87, combining for 222 points. He is also the father of Preston Callander, who played for the University of New Hampshire from 2001–2005. He spent 2005- 2007 with the Wolfsburg Grizzly Adams in the German Elite league and spent the 2007–08 season with the Florida Everblades of the ECHL.

Career statistics

Regular season and playoffs

External links

1956 births
Living people
Canadian expatriate ice hockey players in the United States
Canadian ice hockey centres
Dallas Black Hawks players
Edmonton Oilers (WHA) draft picks
EHC Bayreuth players
Füchse Duisburg players
Ice hockey people from Saskatchewan
Kölner Haie players
Maine Mariners players
Muskegon Lumberjacks players
Philadelphia Flyers draft picks
Philadelphia Flyers players
Regina Pats players
Sportspeople from Regina, Saskatchewan
Springfield Indians players
Vancouver Canucks players